Bruce Weigert Paltrow (November 26, 1943 – October 3, 2002) was an American television and film director and producer. He was the husband of actress Blythe Danner, and the father of actress Gwyneth Paltrow and screenwriter/director Jake Paltrow.

Life and career
Paltrow was born in Brooklyn, New York, the son of Dorothy (née Weigert) and Arnold Paltrow (né Paltrowitz). He had a brother, Robert. He was a first cousin of Spencer J. Giffords, father of Gabby Giffords, who became an American politician and member of the United States House of Representatives. His family was of Eastern European Jewish descent with roots in Minsk. His paternal great-grandfather, whose surname was Paltrowicz, was a Rabbi in Nowogród, modern Belarus. His father and mother owned Paltrow Steel Company and a home in Palm Beach, Florida.

Paltrow studied painting at Tulane University in New Orleans, Louisiana. In the late 1960s, he began directing stage productions in New York City, where he met actress Blythe Danner. They were married from December 14, 1969, until his death.

He was the producer of the television series The White Shadow and St. Elsewhere. His last production was the film Duets, which starred his daughter, Gwyneth.

He also owned a restaurant in Aspen called Gordon's.

Paltrow was a Democrat. He reportedly refused to cast Dwight Schultz for a role on St. Elsewhere because the actor, a political conservative, supported Ronald Reagan.

Death and legacy
Paltrow died on October 3, 2002, at the age of 58, while vacationing in Rome, Italy, to celebrate his daughter's 30th birthday. Paltrow had been diagnosed with oral cancer in 1999; his death was due to complications from oral cancer and pneumonia.

In 2007, his widow Blythe Danner, in co-operation with The Oral Cancer Foundation, set up a fund in his name to address oral cancer issues in the United States. The foundation works primarily in the areas of public awareness, early detection, patient support functions and research.

In 2002, three weeks after Paltrow's death, his daughter Gwyneth met Coldplay singer Chris Martin, whom she married in 2003. The 2005 Coldplay album X&Y carried a dedication to Bruce Paltrow, and the song "Fix You" was written to help Gwyneth through her grief.

References

External links

1943 births
2002 deaths
American people of Belarusian-Jewish descent
American people of Polish-Jewish descent
American male screenwriters
American television directors
Television producers from New York City
American television writers
Deaths from pneumonia in Lazio
Deaths from cancer in Lazio
Deaths from oral cancer
Jewish American writers
Writers from Brooklyn
Tulane University alumni
New York (state) Democrats
Film directors from New York City
Writers Guild of America Award winners
American male television writers
Screenwriters from New York (state)
20th-century American male writers
20th-century American screenwriters
Paltrow family
20th-century American Jews
21st-century American Jews